The Administration of Justice (Emergency Provisions) Act 1939 (2 & 3 Geo. 6 c. 78) was an Act of the Parliament of the United Kingdom that modified the law in England and Wales with regards to juries in England and Wales. It was an emergency measure passed in anticipation of war with Germany, and received royal assent on the day that Germany invaded Poland, beginning the Second World War. Among other things, it reduced the number of people required to serve on a jury in civil or criminal cases from twelve to seven (except in the most serious criminal cases). It also raised the age limit for jury service from 60 to 65, and abolished trial by jury in civil cases, except in cases where the judge ordered that a jury trial was to take place. This was due to the large numbers of people who were expected to be conscripted in the event of a war. The Act was to have effect until the end of the war, when it would be suspended by an Order in Council.

Similar legislation was passed for Scotland and Northern Ireland. In Scotland, where a unanimous verdict was not always required, a majority verdict could be given by five of the seven jurors.

Selected text
Section 7(1) read:
"Notwithstanding anything in any enactment, for the purpose of any trial with a jury or inquiry by a jury in any proceedings, whether civil or criminal, it shall not be necessary for the jury to consist of more than seven persons:
"Provided that the preceding provisions of this subsection shall not apply in relation to the trial of a person on any charge, if the court or a judge thinks fit, by reason of the gravity of the matters in issue, to direct that those provisions shall not apply, and shall not in any case apply in relation to the trial of a person on a charge of treason or murder."
Section 8(1) read:
"No question arising in any civil proceedings in the High Court or in any inferior court of civil jurisdiction shall be tried with a jury, and no writ of enquiry for the assessment of damages or other claim by a jury shall issue, unless the court or a judge is of opinion that the question ought to be tried with a jury or, as the case may be, the assessment ought to be made by a jury and makes an order to that effect."

References

The Public General Acts (London: Eyre & Spottiswoode, 1939)

See also
National Service (Armed Forces) Act 1939

World War II legislation
United Kingdom Acts of Parliament 1939
Emergency laws in the United Kingdom